Greatest Hits is a second greatest hits album by American rapper Kool Moe Dee. It was released in 1993 through Jive Records, making it his first compilation album on the label. The album collects Kool Moe Dee's most popular singles recorded from 1986 to 1991 during his career with Jive Records and also contains four newly recorded songs: "Gimme My Props", "Look At Me Now", "Whosgotdaflava" and "Can U Feel It", which was also released as a single.

Track listing

Sample credits
"Whosgotdaflava" contains elements from "Think (About It)" by Lyn Collins (1972) and "Scenario (Remix)" by A Tribe Called Quest (1992)
"Gimme My Props" contains elements from "Russian Dressing "Adorno Ruso"" by Walter Murphy (1976)
"Look at Me Now" contains elements from "Sing a Simple Song" by Sly & the Family Stone (1968)

Personnel

Mohandes Dewese – vocals, producer (tracks: 1-4, 6-7, 9-15)
Carlton Douglas Ridenhour – vocals (track 13)
Lawrence Parker – vocals (track 13)
Lamar Hula Mahone – backing vocals (track 5), producer (tracks: 5, 8)
Craig Simpkins – backing vocals (track 5), producer (tracks: 5, 8)
Maurice Joshua – backing vocals (track 5)
Ardria Pittman – backing vocals (track 8)
Walter Phillips – backing vocals (track 8)
Bryan "Chuck" New – producer (tracks: 1-2, 9-10, 14), mixing (tracks: 1, 9, 14)
LaVaba Mallison – producer (tracks: 1-4, 6, 9-11, 14), mixing (tracks: 4, 11)
Edward Theodore Riley – producer (tracks: 2, 4, 7, 10, 11, 14)
Peter Brian Harris – producer (tracks: 1-2, 4, 9-11, 14)
Robert Wells – producer (tracks: 2, 10)
Gerrold Holmes – producer (track 3)
Fred Craig MacFarlane – co-producer (track 6)
Keith Spencer – co-producer (tracks: 12, 15)
Dale Hogan – co-producer (tracks: 12, 15)
George Karras – mixing (track 4, 11), recording (track 3)
Stephen George – mixing & recording (tracks: 5, 8)
Chris Trevett – mixing (tracks: 12, 15)
Barbera Aimes – mixing (track 3)
Eric Gast – mixing (track 3)
Tim Latham – recording (tracks: 12, 15)
Tom Coyne – mastering
Barron Ricks – scratches (track 3)

References

External links 

Kool Moe Dee albums
1993 greatest hits albums
Jive Records compilation albums